Peter Morgan Alonso (born December 7, 1994), nicknamed "Polar Bear" and "Big Meat Pete," is an American professional baseball first baseman for the New York Mets of Major League Baseball (MLB). He made his MLB debut during the 2019 season and broke the major league record for the most home runs by a rookie with 53. He was also the first Mets player to hit 50 or more home runs in a season, setting the Mets' single-season home run record in the process.

Early life
Alonso was born in Tampa, Florida to Peter Matthew Alonso (the son of Spanish refugees who fled Barcelona during the Spanish Civil War and moved to Queens, New York but later settled in Lancaster, Ohio) and Michelle Lynn Alonso ( Morgan), a "former college softball player at Ohio Wesleyan University, who would drive young Pete to his games".

Alonso attended Jesuit High School in Tampa for his first two years of high school, and transferred to Henry B. Plant High School in Tampa to finish high school. He played lacrosse and football as a freshman before deciding to focus solely on baseball. For the baseball team, he was a third baseman. He enrolled at the University of Florida, where he played college baseball for the Florida Gators as a first baseman. He was named All-Southeastern Conference in his freshman year. In 2014, he played collegiate summer baseball with the Madison Mallards of the Northwoods League, and in the summer of 2015, he played for the Bourne Braves of the Cape Cod Baseball League. In 2016, his junior year, he hit .374/.469/.659 with 14 home runs and 60 RBIs in 58 games. He competed for Florida in the 2015 and 2016 College World Series.

Professional career

Minor leagues
The New York Mets selected Alonso in the second round, with the 64th pick overall, of the 2016 Major League Baseball draft. He signed with the Mets for a $909,200 signing bonus, and spent 2016 with the Brooklyn Cyclones of the Class A-Short Season New York-Penn League, where he posted a .322 batting average with five home runs and 21 RBIs in thirty games. He was chosen to participate in the league's All-Star Game. He began the 2017 season with the St. Lucie Mets of the Class A-Advanced Florida State League, and after batting .286 with 16 home runs and 58 RBIs in 82 games, was promoted to the Binghamton Rumble Ponies of the Class AA Eastern League in August, where he batted .311 with two home runs and five RBIs in 11 games.

MLB.com ranked Alonso as New York's fourth best prospect going into the 2018 season. He began the 2018 season in Binghamton, and received a midseason promotion to the Las Vegas 51s of the Class AAA Pacific Coast League. He represented the Mets in the 2018 All-Star Futures Game. In 132 games between Binghamton and Las Vegas, he slashed .285/.395/.579 with 36 home runs and 119 RBIs. He won the Joe Bauman Home Run Award. That season, Alonso was the final batter in Cashman Field history, as he hit a walk-off home run in the bottom of the 9th inning during the last baseball game played at the facility.

New York Mets

2019 (Rookie season)
Alonso made the Mets Opening Day roster in 2019 as the starting first baseman. He was in the team's starting lineup on Opening Day on March 28, and recorded his first major league hit against Washington Nationals pitcher Justin Miller in the eighth inning. First publicized on March 30, third-base coach Gary DiSarcina gave Alonso the endearing nickname "Polar Bear" for his power. He hit his first major league home run on April 1 off of Drew Steckenrider of the Miami Marlins. On April 9, Alonso had his first career multi-home run game against the Minnesota Twins.

Alonso became the first player in MLB history since 1900 with 11 extra-base hits in his first 10 career games. No other player ever had more than nine. In April, Alonso batted .292 with nine home runs, eight doubles, one triple and 26 RBIs in his first games in the big leagues. He won the National League Rookie of the Month Award for April. Alonso's nine home runs led all MLB rookies and are tied for the most by a Mets player before May 1 with Neil Walker (2016), John Buck (2013), Carlos Delgado (2006) and Dave Kingman (1976).

On June 22, Alonso hit his 26th home run, breaking the National League record for most home runs by a rookie before the All-Star break, passing Cody Bellinger. The next day, with his 27th home run, he broke the Mets rookie home run record, previously set by Darryl Strawberry in 1983. Alonso was selected as a reserve to the 2019 All-Star Game. He also won the National League Rookie of the Month Award for the month of June.

On July 7, Alonso became the second player in Mets history to hit the most home runs (30) before the All-Star break, after Dave Kingman (1976). On July 8, Alonso won the 2019 MLB Home Run Derby, defeating Toronto Blue Jays third baseman Vladimir Guerrero Jr. 23–22 in the final round, becoming only the second rookie, after Aaron Judge, to win the Derby outright. On the way to the final round, Alonso also beat Carlos Santana and Ronald Acuña Jr., hitting 57 total home runs during the entire Derby.

On August 15, Alonso hit his 39th home run, tying Bellinger for the most home runs by a rookie in National League history. Alonso finished the game with a career-high five hits and six RBIs. He broke Bellinger's record on August 18 with his 40th home run in an 11–5 win against the Kansas City Royals. On August 27, Alonso hit his 42nd home run to become the Mets all-time single-season home run leader, surpassing Carlos Beltrán and Todd Hundley. He is the first rookie to set his franchise's single-season home run record since Johnny Rizzo did it for the Pittsburgh Pirates in 1938.

On September 27, Alonso hit his 52nd home run of the season, tying Aaron Judge for the most home runs by a rookie in MLB history. He hit his 53rd the next day to break Judge's record. His 53 home runs led all of Major League Baseball for the 2019 season. On November 11, Alonso was awarded the National League Rookie of the Year, receiving 29 of 30 first-place votes. On December 10, Alonso was named to the first team of the inaugural All-MLB Team.

2020
In the 2020 season shortened by COVID-19, Alonso played in 57 of the 60 games and batted .231/.326/.490 with 16 home runs and 35 RBIs. 

On September 3, 2020, he hit his first career walk-off home run. Alonso's sophomore season was a step back from his breakout rookie year; Danny Abriano of Yahoo Sports called it "a season to forget" and Zach Braziller of the New York Post called it "underwhelming". However, he had the highest maximum exit velocity of all major league hitters, at 118.4 mph.

Alonso's sophomore slump coupled with a second consecutive breakout season from Dominic Smith led some talent evaluators to favor the latter as the team's starting first baseman heading into the 2021 season.

2021
On July 12, Alonso won his second straight Home Run Derby after defeating Baltimore Orioles first baseman Trey Mancini 23–22 in the final round. He became the third player ever to win back-to-back Home Run Derbys, as well as the fourth player to win two Home Run Derbys (after Ken Griffey Jr., Prince Fielder, and Yoenis Céspedes). Newsday Mets beat writer Tim Healey noted Alonso has earned $2 million from winning the Home Run Derby twice while making $1.47 million from 2019–2021 in base salary while playing for the Mets.

On September 7, Alonso hit his 100th career home run off Miami Marlins pitcher Edward Cabrera. He accomplished the feat in 347 games, becoming the second-fastest player to reach 100 career home runs behind Ryan Howard, who did it in 325 games.

Alonso played in 152 games for the Mets in 2021, batting .262/.344/.519 with 37 home runs and 94 RBIs.

2022

On March 22, 2022, Alonso signed a $7.4 million contract with the Mets, avoiding salary arbitration.

On April 9, 2022, Alonso hit his first career grand slam during a game against the Washington Nationals off of pitcher Joan Adon in the fifth inning.

 

On June 17, 2022, Alonso hit his second career grand slam during a game against the Miami Marlins off of pitcher Tommy Nance in the sixth inning.

On July 10, 2022, Alonso was named to the 2022 MLB All-Star Game as a representative for the National League, the second selection of his career. He was chosen as a reserve for the squad, with St. Louis Cardinals first baseman Paul Goldschmidt starting at the position. He also accepted a third consecutive nomination to the Home Run Derby, stating that he will have former Mets pitching coach Dave Jauss pitch to him. Jauss now works with the Washington Nationals, but has maintained contact with Alonso and agreed to pitch again in the Derby.

In a September 25 game against the Oakland Athletics, Alonso drove in five runs, setting a new Mets' single-season RBI record with 125. He broke the record on a 451-foot two-run home run in the fourth inning off of pitcher Norge Ruiz. The Mets previous RBI record was held by Mike Piazza (1999) and David Wright (2008).  

On September 27 against the Miami Marlins, Alonso hit his 40th home run of the season, becoming the first Mets player to accomplish the feat twice. 

Alonso ended the season with 131 RBIs, breaking the franchise record and tying with Aaron Judge for the 2022 Major League lead.

International career
On August 17, 2022, Alonso announced that he would join the United States national baseball team in the 2023 World Baseball Classic. "There are lots of amazing guys on the team so far," he said. "I've always wanted to play in [the WBC]. It's an honor to play for the Stars-and-Stripes."

Personal life
Alonso married his wife, Haley, in November 2021.

On March 13, 2022, Alonso was involved in a car accident in Tampa, Florida, which he described as a "really close experience to death." A driver ran a red light and struck Alonso's vehicle, which flipped over three times. Neither Alonso nor anyone else involved in the incident was injured.

An avid outdoorsman, he enjoys hunting and fishing. He was also featured in a season 9 episode of MeatEater in which he hunted mule deer in Colorado with Steven Rinella.

See also
 50 home run club
 Home Run Derby
 Joe Bauman Home Run Award
 List of Major League Baseball annual home run leaders
 List of Major League Baseball annual runs batted in leaders
 List of New York Mets team records
 Major League Baseball Player of the Week Award
 Major League Baseball Rookie of the Month Award
 Major League Baseball Rookie of the Year Award
 Sporting News Rookie of the Year Award
 All MLB Team

Notes

References

External links

1994 births
Living people
American people of Spanish descent
Baseball players from Tampa, Florida
Binghamton Rumble Ponies players
Bourne Braves players
Brooklyn Cyclones players
Florida Gators baseball players
Las Vegas 51s players
Major League Baseball first basemen
Major League Baseball Rookie of the Year Award winners
National League All-Stars
National League home run champions
National League RBI champions
New York Mets players
St. Lucie Mets players
Madison Mallards players
Henry B. Plant High School alumni
2023 World Baseball Classic players